Charles Perry (born 1941) is an American food historian. He has translated several medieval cookbooks from Arabic to English and published widely on the history of food, particularly of the Middle East and California. He also authored or co-authored books about San Francisco in the 1960s, and was a prolific journalist for Rolling Stone, the Los Angeles Times and other publications.

Biography 
Perry was born in Los Angeles, California in 1941 and attended public schools. From 1959 to 1961, he majored in Middle Eastern studies at Princeton University. In 1961, he transferred to the University of California, Berkeley, and in 1962 he spent a year at the Middle East Centre for Arab Studies in Shemlan, Lebanon, where he earned the British Foreign Office’s higher standard interpretership certificate. He graduated from Berkeley in 1964.

In his senior year, one of his roommates was the future “LSD millionaire” Owsley Stanley; as a result of their friendship, Perry was present for most of the great events of the San Francisco psychedelic scene of the mid-1960s. In 1968, he started working at  Rolling Stone and was the first editorial employee who lasted more than a few weeks. He remained at Rolling Stone as an editor and staff writer until 1976, when he left to write The Haight-Ashbury: A History for Random House.

While working on the book, he moved back to Los Angeles to pursue a new career as a freelance food writer in 1978. His business card read “My pledge: never to use the words ‘eminently,’ ‘delectable’ or ‘morsel’”. In 1980, he spent two months in Egypt, Syria and England collecting medieval Arabic cookery manuscripts and subsequently added more from Turkey and elsewhere. In 1981, he attended the first full Oxford Symposium on Food and Cookery. In the 1980s he became one of the major contributors to Symposium co-founder Alan Davidson’s Petits Propos Culinaires and to The Oxford Companion to Food. He later served as a trustee of the Symposium from 2004 to 2008.

In 1990, he became a staff writer for the food section of the Los Angeles Times, where he remained until 2008. In 1995, he co-founded the Culinary Historians of Southern California and has served as its president since that time.

Perry’s grandmother was pioneer Hollywood screenwriter and film editor Kate Alaska Corbaley and his younger sister was the volleyball star and Olympic athlete Mary Perry. He lives in the Los Angeles area and continues to contribute scholarly and popular articles about food to such publications as Saudi Aramco World and the Istanbul-based Cornucopia. He has contributed papers to most Oxford Symposiums since 1981 and lectures about food history in the U.S. and Turkey.

Publications
Scents And Flavors: A Syrian Cookbook (Editor and translator) New York University Press, 2017
A Baghdad Cookery Book Newly Translated, Prospect Books, 2005; Kitâbu’t-Tabih of Muhammad bin Hasan al-Baghdadi Turkish translation by Nazlı Piskin, published by Kitapyayınevi, Istanbul, 2009.
“Middle Eastern Food History,” in Food in Time and Place: The American Historical Association Companion to Food History (University of California, Berkeley, 2014). 
The Haight-Ashbury: A History, Straight Arrow/Random House, 1984, reissued 2005 by WennerBooks
Totally Hot! The Complete Hot Pepper Cookbook, Doubleday, 1985 (co-author)
Spuds, Truffles and Wild Gnocchi: The Patina Cookbook, Collins, 1995 (co-author with Joachim Splichal)
Medieval Arab Cookery, essays and translations by A.J. Arberry, Maxime Rodinson and Charles Perry. (Prospect Books, Totnes; 2000)
Scents and Flavors: A Syrian Cookbook, an edition and translation of the 13th-century Kitāb al-Wuṣlah ilā l-Ḥabīb. (New York University Press, New York/Abu Dhabi, 2017)

References

Food writers
1941 births
Living people
Writers from Los Angeles
Princeton University alumni
University of California, Berkeley alumni
Los Angeles Times people
Rolling Stone people
20th-century American people
21st-century American people